"In the Morning" (also called "Mafia in the Morning") is a song recorded by South Korean girl group Itzy. It was released on April 30, 2021, through JYP Entertainment, as the lead single from the group's fourth extended play, Guess Who. Produced by JYP Entertainment's founder, J.Y. Park, alongside South Korean songwriters Danke and Kass and composer Lee Hae-sol, the track's transfixing chorus sees the group explore various new vocal styles to match the trippy synth of the single.

"In the Morning" was described as a song about secretly stealing someone's heart. Musically, it is primarily a hip hop track with elements of dance and trap with its title referring to the popular party game Mafia, and a metaphor for aiming to be caught in a relationship. The accompanying music video, directed by Bang Jae-yeob, premiered simultaneously with the release of the single. Sporting a dark atmosphere, the video depicts Itzy performing fierce choreography on various glamorous sets.

Commercially, the song became the group's fifth top-ten hit, peaking at number ten on Gaon Digital Chart and at number four on the component Download Chart. It also attained commercial success on Billboard charts, peaking at number 7 on K-pop Hot 100, number 3 on World Digital Songs and number 22 on Global Excl. U.S.

To promote "In the Morning", the group appeared and performed on several South Korean music programs including M! Countdown, Music Bank, and Show! Music Core. An English version of the song was released as a digital single on May 14, 2021.

Background and release
On April 12, 2021, the group unveiled the track listing to the EP on the group's official SNS accounts and website, revealing "In the Morning" as the lead single. Starting from April 13, the group's label uploaded various teasers for each member on their respective social media accounts. The first music video teaser for "In the Morning" was released on April 26. On the next day, the second music video teaser for the song was published. On April 28, the third music video teaser for the lead single was published. "In the Morning" was released for digital download and streaming as the lead single from Guess Who on April 30, 2021, by JYP Entertainment. The English version of "In the Morning" was released on May 14, along with the song's lyric video.

Itzy's first compilation album It'z Itzy, released on December 22, 2021, includes both Korean and Japanese-language versions of "In the Morning". The Japanese lyrics were written by Yuka Matsumoto.

Composition and reception
"In the Morning" was written by Park Jin-young, Kass, Danke and Lyre. The song is a "powerful" hip hop track with an "addictive" dance-trap composition, heightening the track's core concepts of ambiguity and suspense. The track's chorus sees the group explore various vocal styles backed by a "trippy" synth. Lyrically, the song is about secretly stealing someone's heart. The title is a reference to the popular party game Mafia, and a metaphor for aiming to be caught in a relationship. Itzy compare their power to a mafia as they vow to win their future partner over. In terms of musical notation, the song is composed in the key of B minor, with a tempo of 140 beats per minute, and runs for two minutes and fifty-two seconds.

"In the Morning" was met with mixed reviews from music critics. Writing for Forbes, Jeff Benjamin described the song as a "sinister" hip hop track with "one of their boldest and most experimental sounds yet". Divyansha Dongre from the India version of Rolling Stone noted that the song "sees the group explore various new vocal styles". In a mixed review, Sofiana Ramli of NME felt that the track "sounds like almost every other EDM-oriented song that’s been churned out in K-pop today". Joshua Minsoo Kim of Pitchfork found that, although their debut "established the quintet as a massive new force in the industry", their latest release, "In the Morning", was the biggest offender from Guess Who, commenting that in the song "there's a Cardi B lilt in the verses, but it otherwise feels like Blackpink without the stadium-sized grandeur".

Commercial performance
"In the Morning" debuted and peaked at number 22 on the Global Excl. U.S. chart with 36.2 million streams outside the US and also at number 34 on the Global 200 chart, becoming their highest entry on both. By doubling their total number of appearances, the band became the second-ever girl group from South Korea to hit the ranking more than once. The song peaked at number ten on South Korea's Gaon Digital Chart with chart issue dated May 9–15, 2021, making it Itzy's fifth top ten single on the chart. It also peaked at number four and nine on Download Chart and Streaming Chart, respectively. In addition, it peaked at number 59 on the component BGM chart.

Music video

Three teaser videos were released prior to the song's release. An accompanying music video was uploaded to JYP Entertainment's YouTube channel on April 30, 2021. It was directed by Bang Jae-yeob. In three days, the music video reached fifty million views. After one week, the video suprassed over 70 million views. The dance practice video was uploaded on May 2, 2021, and has received over 6 million views as of May 2021. On May 22, 2021, the music video hit 100 million views, which took only 22 days and 12 hours to achieved, becoming the quickest of the group's videos to reach the milestone. The music video opens with Ryujin in a cropped jacket and pleated skirt posing among mannequins in a fashion shop. The next scene shows the group all in black while dancing in a streets in a small town. The scene shifts to a quaint floral greenhouse, where Lia is shown singing in a floral gown with Itzy dressed in elegant clothes. Later in the clip, the girl group showcase their fierce choreography on a set decorated with samurai swords. Then, Yuna is shown next to a mirror in a neon green draped dress with a black bodysuit. In the next part, the group is dancing surrounded by flames.

Track listing
Digital download and streaming (English version)
 "In the Morning" (English version) – 2:52

Credits and personnel
Credits adapted from Melon.

Recording and management

Original published by JYP Publishing (KOMCA), Big Stage Music LLC, BMG Gold Songs, Lalala Studio, Copyright Control
Sub-published by JYP Publishing (KOMCA), Fujipacific Music Korea Inc., Copyright Control
Instrumental recording and production at LYRE Lair
Digital edited, recorded, mixed at JYPE Studios
Mastered at Sterling Sound, United States

Personnel

Itzy – lead vocals
J.Y. Park "The Asiansoul" – lyrics, composition, arrangement, sessions all instruments, vocal director
Kass – lyrics, composition
Danke – lyrics
Lyre – lyrics, composition, arrangement
Earattack – composition, arrangement, keyboard
Lee Hae-sol – composition, arrangement, sessions all instruments
Alina Smith – instrumental recording and production
Annalise Morelli – instrumental recording and production
Sound Kim – background vocals
Uhm Se-hee – digital editing, recording
Gu Hye-jin – recording
Lee Tae-seop – mixing
Chris Gehringer – mastering

Accolades

Charts

Weekly charts

Monthly charts

Year-end charts

Release history

References

Itzy songs
2021 singles
2021 songs
JYP Entertainment singles
Songs written by Park Jin-young